Henning Elof Sjöström (13 May 1922, Burträsk – 16 October 2011) was a Swedish defense attorney, and regarded as Sweden's first celebrity lawyer due to his high-profile cases. Sjöström was the attorney for Kurt Haijby during the Haijby affair, in which Haijby was accused of blackmailing Swedish King Gustav V. He was also known for the through the trial of the "neurosedyn children" 1964–1968 and for having defended Gunnar Bengtsson after the Söderhamn courthouse murders in 1971.

Sjöström was married to fellow defense attorney Kerstin Sandels. He died in Stockholm in 2011.

Bibliography
 Vägen från byn (1963)
 Vägen förbi (1965) (with Ernst Sjöström)
 Det glatta livet (1966) (with Ernst Sjöström)
 Så fortsatte vägen från byn (1968) (with Ernst Sjöström)
 Silverarken (1969) (with Ernst Sjöström)
 Kvinnorna i byn (1973)
 Männen från byn (1974)
 Mördaren i byn (1975) (with Gunnar Sjöström)
 Pigorna i byn (1976) (with Ernst Sjöström)

References

1922 births
2011 deaths
People from Skellefteå Municipality
20th-century Swedish lawyers
Writers from Västerbotten